The 2013 ADAC Zurich 24 Hours of Nürburgring was the 41st running of the 24 Hours of Nürburgring. It took place over May 19–20, 2013. The race was suspended for over 9 hours due to heavy rain.

The #9 Black Falcon team won the race on a Mercedes-Benz SLS AMG. DTM legend Bernd Schneider also won the Dubai 24 Hour, the Bathurst 12 Hour and the Spa 24 Hours the same year.

Race results
Class winners in bold.

External links
 2013 24 Hours of Nürburgring official results
 Mercedes claims first Nurburgring 24 Hours victory - Autosport, 20 May 2013

Nürburgring 24 Hours
2013 in German motorsport
May 2013 sports events in Germany